Alecu Russo (March 17, 1819 near Chișinău – February 5, 1859 in Iași), was a Moldavian Romanian writer, literary critic and publicist.

Russo is credited with having discovered one of the most elaborate forms of the Romanian national folk ballad Miorița. He was also a contributor to the Iași periodical Zimbrul, in which he published one of his best-known works, Studie Moldovană ("Moldovan Studies"), in 1851–1852.

He also wrote Iașii și locuitorii lui în 1840 ("Iași and its inhabitants in 1840"), a glimpse into Moldavian society during the Organic Statute administration, and two  travel accounts (better described as folklore studies), Piatra Teiului and Stânca Corbului.

Russo is also notable for his Amintiri ("Recollections"), a memoir, and for the prose poem . Both these works appeared in 1855 in Vasile Alecsandri's literary magazine, România Literară. 

He died shortly before the age of 40. His cause of death is recorded as troahnă, usually denoting influenza, but sometimes a euphemism for tuberculosis. He was buried with great pomp at the Bărboi Church, in Iași.

Presence in anthologies
The Bessarabia of my Soul / Basarabia Sufletului meu. A collection of poetry from the Republic of Moldova, bilingual English & Romanian, Daniel Ioniță and Maria Tonu (editors), with Eva Foster, Daniel Reynaud and Rochelle Bews, MediaTon, Toronto, Canada, 2018.

Notes

External links

Encyclopedia of 1848 Revolutions:Alecu Russo

1819 births
1859 deaths
Writers from Chișinău
Romanian literary critics
Romanian memoirists
Romanian essayists
Romanian travel writers
Moldovan writers
Moldovan male writers
19th-century memoirists